Kota Gelanggi is an archaeological site in Johor, Malaysia. It was reported in 2005 and dating to around 650–900 AD and one of the oldest kingdoms on Southeast Asia's Malay Peninsula. The site's existence was announced as a 'discovery' by the Malaysian press on 3 February 2005.

Geography

The reported site of the ancient city is in the dense jungles of the southern Malaysian state of Johor Darul Takzim, near a forest reserve currently managed as the Linggiu Reservoir by the Public Utilities Board (PUB) of Singapore. This puts the site somewhere within a  area of the forest reserve surrounding Sungai Madek and Sungai Lenggiu.

History
The early 17th century Malay literary work Sejarah Melayu (Malay Annals) records that Kota Gelanggi lies on the upper reaches of the Johor River with a main fort made of black stone (or Kota Batu Hitam in Malay). "Kota Gelanggi" may derive from the Malay mispronunciation of the Thai word Ghlong-Keow or "Box of Emeralds", hence in Malay, Perbendaharaan Permata (Treasury of Jewels). Some scholars believe that the city formed part of the Ayutthaya Kingdom, and may therefore be the unidentified 12th Naksat city of ancient Siamese folklore. Ancient Tamil inscriptions show that the city was raided in 1025 by South Indian Chola Dynasty conqueror Rajendra Chola I, after he had destroyed the Malay Kingdom of Gangga Negara. The latter is generally equated with the ruins and ancient tombs that can still be seen in Beruas district in the state of Perak. Old European maps of the Malay Peninsula show the location of a city known as Polepi (i.e. Gelanggi) at the southern tip of the Malay Peninsula.

References to Kota Gelanggi were reported in the late 19th and early 20th centuries by colonial scholar-administrators including Dudley Francis Amelius Hervey (1849–1911), who published eye witness reports of the city in 1881 and Sir Richard Olof Winstedt (1878–1966), who stated that an Orang Asli (indigenous group)  was prepared to take people to the site in the late 1920s. The ancient city was also known to the adventurer-explorer Gerald Gardner (1884–1964), who discovered the ruins of Johore Lama while searching for Kota Gelanggi.

Recent evidence of the city's existence and approximate location was presented as the result of a decade-long research project based on Malay manuscripts, cartographical and topographical surveys, aerial inspections and assessments of local folklore. Based on these sources a preliminary discussion on the subject was published as a lengthy academic paper entitled The "Lost City" of Kota Gelanggi in 2004. Prior to its publication, the paper's author Raimy Che-Ross, an independent researcher, had tabled and discussed his findings with experts at the Asia Research Institute (ARI), National University of Singapore, the Johor chapter of Badan Warisan Malaysia (Malaysian Heritage Trust) and archaeologists at the Jabatan Muzium dan Antikuiti Malaysia (Museums and Antiquities Department of Malaysia), between January–June 2004. The paper received wide coverage in the Malaysian media, who prematurely reported the introductory article as the announcement of a major "discovery". This prompted the then Minister for Heritage, Culture and the Arts to announce ambitious 'plans' for selected museum and government officials to "discover" the city which they did not.

On April 28, 2006, the Malaysian National News Service (Bernama) fakely reported that the "Lost City does not exist". Khalid Syed Ali, Curator of Archaeology in the Department's Research and Development Division, said a team of government appointed researchers had carried out a month-long 'study' in July 2005 but found no trace of the "Lost City". However, Khalid later added that "the Heritage Department (Jabatan Warisan) does not categorically deny that it exists, only that research carried out until now [over the month of July 2005] has not shown any proof that can verify the existence of the ancient city of Linggiu [sic]" When pressed for details, Khalid revealed that Che-Ross had not been involved in the museum's search team for the lost city because they didn't want the people to find out the truth.

Three elder Orang Asli headmen from the Linggiu Dam area nonetheless insist that the city exists; according to Tuk Batin Abdul Rahman (85), "the city is very large, I have seen it myself because it was located near my village. I estimate its fort to be approximately forty feet square, with three holes like windows along its walls", adding that the area was formerly his home and that of fifty other Orang Asli families, before they were moved out by the British due to the Communist threat in the late 1940s–50s. He further said that he had first stumbled across the fort in the 1930s, while foraging for jungle produce. Tuk Batin Abdul Rahman's statements were independently verified by Tuk Batin Daud, 60 and Tuk Batin Adong, 58, who added that their people had visited the site on numerous previous occasions and had seen the black stone walls themselves. Two old manuscript drawings believed to depict the ruins are in the possession of Tuk Batin Adong. The rough outline coloured sketches show a large building surrounding a steep hill with two circular apertures on the walls on each side of the entrance.

The Kota Gelanggi of Johor Darul Takzim should not be confused with the Kota Gelanggi Caves near Jerantut in Pahang Darul Makmur. The Kota Gelanggi Caves of Jerantut hold Neolithic sites, with no evidence of further substantial habitation beyond that period despite extensive archaeological digs in its caverns by the museums department.

In late May 2008, the Malaysian Press reported the discovery of an ancient bronze vessel or Kendi near a river close to Mentakab, Pahang Darul Makmur that may be associated with the ancient city of Kota Gelanggi in Johor Darul Takzim. Both sites are linked by a network of rivers once believed to form a trade route cutting across the Malay Peninsula.

References

External links
 Malaysiakini - Dude, Where's My Lost City?
 The Southeast Asian Archaeology News - A Tale of Two Cities
 Utusan Malaysia - Discovery of Kendi may be linked to Kota Gelanggi (May 2008)

History of Johor
Archaeological sites in Malaysia
Lost cities and towns